Ocean Power Technologies Australasia Pty Ltd (OPTA) is an Australian company, a subsidiary of Ocean Power Technologies Inc (OPT) of the United States, a renewable energy company, providing power generation devices, services and related equipment for the extraction of energy from ocean waves.

In 2009 OPTA was part of Victorian Wave Partners formed to develop a 19 megawatt wave power project near Portland, Victoria connected to the grid. The project was to receive an AU$66.46 million grant from the Australia federal government. By 2014, the consortium had abandoned the project, saying it was not commercially viable. OPT had given up on plans to develop the project, which was to cost $232 million for which the Australian government had offered $66.5 million in funding support.

Media Coverage

2012 

 Wave Energy Company Finds Its Sea Legs
 Victoria project - January
 Victoria Australia project to add jobs - July
 Ocean Power Technologies and Lockheed Martin take wave power down under - July
 Ocean Power Technologies and Lockheed Martin to Develop Wave-Energy Project in Australia - July
 Innovations In Wave Power: An Interview With Dr. George Taylor - July
 Lockheed Martin, Woodside in wave power project - July
 Oregon wave power project gets green light to go forward - August
Ocean Power Technologies Receives Federal Approval for the First Commercial Wave Farm in the US - August
 Federal approval for the first commercial wave farm
 Reedsport Development News - September
 OPT To Work With U.S. Department Of Homeland Security - September
 Reedsport Development Update - Deployment in spring 2013 - October
 Alliance with Mitsui Engineering & Shipbuilding-Japan - October
 Herald On-Line: Mitsui Alliance - October
 OPT Contract Awarded by Mitsui - October
 OPT and Mitsui to steer wave device to possible Japan launch - October
 OPT Establishes New Business Unit to Drive Growth - November

See also 

 Ocean energy
 Wave power
 Wave farms

References

External links 

Victoria Wave Partners

OPT Global Partners

Renewable energy technology companies
Wave power
Energy conversion
Renewable energy in Australia
Power station technology
Renewable energy companies of Australia